Darren Hill may refer to:

 Darren Hill (footballer) (born 1981), Scottish footballer
 Darren Hill (musician), American musician
 Darryn Hill (born 1974), Australian racing cyclist